The Valley of Moche, or Valley of Santa Catalina, is a large area of the La Libertad Region in northern Peru surrounding the Moche River. It has been farmed since the pre-Columbian era and currently contains rural and urban settlements. Trujillo is the most important city of the valley. It is now the location of several towns and agricultural areas where products such as sugarcane and asparagus are cultivated. The irrigation of its lands is part of the Chavimochic hydraulic engineering project.

History
The pre-Columbian cultures Moche and Chimu emerged here. The Mochicas applied their knowledge of Hydraulic engineering and developed cultivation techniques in the valley and then on the arid coastline of northern Peru. Their culture flourished from 100 AD to 500 AD.

The Chimu developed later, rising from 900 AD to 1370 AD, when they were conquered by the Inca.

Agriculture
It is a territory made fertile by the presence of the Moche river.  One of the techniques applied in the valley is planting "wachaques" - wells dug to find water near the sea. "Totora" reeds (Scirpus californicus) were able to adapt to the brackish waters.

Major products cultivated in the valley are:

Livestock include cattle, horses, alpaca, sheep and Llama.

Notable places
Some interesting places in the valley are:

See also

External links
Location of Moche valley (Wikimapia)
San Jose Festival

Multimedia
  in Trujillo city (Peru).

References

Geography of Trujillo, Peru
Valleys of La Libertad Region